Ramkrishna Jagannath Patil, popularly known as Ramkrishna Baba (2 September 1936 – 2 September 2020) was an Indian politician. He was a member of the Indian National Congress political party from Aurangabad, Maharashtra.

Political career
Patil was a two time member of Maharashtra Legislative Assembly from Vaijapur between 1985-95. He was elected to the 12th Lok Sabha in 1998 from the Aurangabad (Maharashtra Lok Sabha constituency).

He was also an agriculturist and bank chairman by profession besides being a politician and social worker. He served as the chairman of District Central Cooperative Bank in Aurangabad for 25 consecutive years.

Personal life
Patil was born on 2 September 1936 in Dahegaon near Aurangabad. He completed his education until matriculation.

He died of diabetic complications due to old age in Aurangabad on 2 September 2020 at the age of 84. He was cremated in Dahegaon.

Positions held
1978-1980	Chairman, Panchayat Samiti, Vaijapur, Aurangabad
1985-1995:	Member, Maharashtra Legislative Assembly (two terms)
1998:	Elected to 12th Lok Sabha
1998-99:	Member, Committee on Agriculture Member, Consultative Committee, Ministry of Finance

See also
 Vaijapur (Vidhan Sabha constituency)
 Aurangabad (Maharashtra Lok Sabha constituency)
 12th Lok Sabha
 List of members of the 12th Lok Sabha

References 

1936 births
2020 deaths
India MPs 1998–1999
People from Aurangabad, Maharashtra
Indian National Congress politicians
Lok Sabha members from Maharashtra
State cabinet ministers of Maharashtra
Maharashtra MLAs 1985–1990
Maharashtra MLAs 1990–1995